61 (sixty-one) is the natural number following 60 and preceding 62.

In mathematics
61 is:

the 18th prime number.
a twin prime with 59.
a cuban prime of the form p = , where x = y + 1.
the smallest proper prime, a prime p which ends in the digit 1 in base 10 and whose reciprocal in base 10 has a repeating sequence with length p − 1. In such primes, each digit 0, 1, ..., 9 appears in the repeating sequence the same number of times as does each other digit (namely,  times).
the exponent of the 9th Mersenne prime. (261 − 1 = )
the sum of two squares, 52 + 62.
a centered square number.
a centered hexagonal number.
a centered decagonal number.
the sixth Euler zigzag number (or Up/down number).
a unique prime in base 14, since no other prime has a 6-digit period in base 14.
a Pillai prime since 8! + 1 is divisible by 61 but 61 is not one more than a multiple of 8.
a Keith number, because it recurs in a Fibonacci-like sequence started from its base 10 digits: 6, 1, 7, 8, 15, 23, 38, 61...
palindromic in bases 6 (1416) and 60 (1160)

In the list of Fortunate numbers, 61 occurs thrice, since adding 61 to either the tenth, twelfth or seventeenth primorial gives a prime number (namely 6,469,693,291; 7,420,738,134,871; and 1,922,760,350,154,212,639,131).

In science
 The chemical element with the atomic number 61 is promethium.

Astronomy
Messier object M61, a magnitude 10.5 galaxy in the constellation Virgo
The New General Catalogue object NGC 61, a double spiral galaxy in the constellation Cetus
61 Ursae Majoris is located about 31.1 light-years from the Sun. 
61 Cygni was christened the "Flying Star" in 1792 by Giuseppe Piazzi (1746–1826) for its unusually large proper motion.

In other fields

Sixty-one is:
 The number of the French department Orne
 The code for international direct dial phone calls to Australia
 61*, a 2001 baseball movie directed by Billy Crystal
 Highway 61 Revisited is a Bob Dylan album
 The Highway 61 Blues Festival occurs annually in Leland, Mississippi
 Highway 61 is a 1991 film set on U.S. Route 61
 U.S. Route 61 is the highway that inspired so much attention on "Highway 61"
 Part 61 is a law created by the FAA regarding medical exams. This law has often come under attack by AOPA.
 The P-61 is the Northrop-designed fighter first designated as the XP-61. It first flew on May 26, 1942. It is also known as the Black Widow as it was the first fighter aircraft designed to be a night fighter
 Sixty 1 is a brand tobacco produced by Nationwide Tobacco
 61A is the London address of Margot Wendice (Grace Kelly) and Tony Wendice (Ray Milland) in the movie Dial M for Murder
 1 Liberty Place is one of Philadelphia's tallest buildings at 61 stories
 The number of cadets on The Summerall Guards
 The number of points required to win a "standard" game of cribbage
 The maximum number of tables that can be joined in a single MariaDB or MySQL query

In sports
 New York Yankees right fielder Roger Maris hit 61 home runs in 1961, breaking Babe Ruth's single-season record until it was surpassed in 1998 by Mark McGwire and Sammy Sosa.
 Nolan Ryan and Tom Seaver each had 61 career shutouts
 Hockey great Wayne Gretzky holds or shares 61 NHL records (40 for regular season, 15 for Stanley Cup playoff, and 6 for All-Star Games)
 Rotation, a variation of pool, is sometimes called 61
 Richie Evans' NASCAR Whelen Modified Tour car number was 61 until his death in 1985
The number of the laps of the first Formula One night race, Singapore Grand Prix.

References
 R. Crandall and C. Pomerance (2005). Prime Numbers: A Computational Perspective. Springer, NY, 2005, p. 79.

External links

Integers